The Onniguds (Khalkha-Mongolian: Оннигууд/Onniguud) are a sub-ethnic group of the Southern Mongols in Ongniud Banner, China.  They were ruled by  Genghis Khan's relative Otchigin noyan in the 13th century.

See also 
 Administrative divisions of Northern Yuan Dynasty
 Demographics of Mongolia
 Demographics of China
 List of medieval Mongolian tribes and clans
 List of Mongolian monarchs
 Mongols in China
 Southern Mongolian dialect
 Northern Mongolia
 Western Mongolia

Mongols
Southern Mongols